The 2014 CBR Brave season was the Brave's 1st season in the Australian Ice Hockey League since being founded in pre-season before the 2014 AIHL season. The season ran from 12 April 2014 to 30 August 2014 for the Brave. CBR finished third in their inaugural regular season behind the Melbourne Mustangs and Melbourne Ice. The Brave qualified for the AIHL Finals in Melbourne and played in semi-final two. Canberra were defeated by the Melbourne Ice, 1–6 in their semi-final match and were knocked out of the finals weekend, ending their season.

News

The CBR Brave was established in March 2014 following the collapse of the Canberra Knights in late February. The Brave appointed former player Matti Luoma as their inaugural head coach. The team filled their playing roster quickly with a mix of local and international players. The first visa player to join the team was Finnish goaltender Petri Pitkänen. The Brave filled their visa quota with the signings of Anton Kokkonen, Stephen Blunden and Mathieu Ouellett.

12 April 2014, The Brave played their maiden AIHL match at home in front of around 1,000 fans against the Newcastle North Stars. The visiting North Stars won the match 2–0. The Brave won their second match to record their first victory. The defeated the defending champions, the Sydney Ice Dogs, with a dominant third period display.

In July, one home match at Phillip had to be cancelled due to the travelling Adelaide Adrenaline team suffering a bus crash. A number of the Adelaide players were taken to hospital as a precaution but no one was seriously injured. The match was originally postponed but the league commission eventually cancelled the fixture and gave both teams one competition point each.

In August the Brave finished the regular season third in the table, qualifying for the AIHL finals weekend in Melbourne. It was the first time since the AIHL was founded in 2000 that a Canberra-based team had qualified for finals.

Roster

Team roster for the 2014 AIHL season

Transfers

All the player transfers in and out by the CBR Brave for the 2014 AIHL season.

In

Out

 N/A - first season

Staff

Staff Roster for 2014 AIHL season

Standings

Regular season

Summary

Position by round

League table

Source

Finals

Summary

Bracket

Schedule & results

Regular season

Results per match day

Finals
Goodall Cup semi-final

Player statistics

Skaters

Goaltenders

Awards

References

CBR Brave seasons